The Berardo Collection Museum (in Portuguese: Museu Colecção Berardo) was a museum of modern and contemporary art in Belém, a district of Lisbon, Portugal. It was replaced by the Conteporary Art Museum - Centro Cultural de Belém in January 2023.

History
In 2006, after 10 years of negotiations, José Berardo signed an agreement with the Portuguese government to loan art from his collection on a long-term basis to the Centro Cultural de Belém in Lisbon. Under the partnership agreement the Portuguese state incurs the costs of displaying Berardo’s collection. The art holdings themselves are owned and managed by a company known as the Berardo Collection Association. The museum was formally initiated as the Foundation of Modern and Contemporary Art on August 9, 2006 (Decree-Law 164/2006). It was inaugurated on June 25, 2007 and is named after Berardo and his collection. At the time, auction house Christie’s valued the exhibited works at around 316 million euros ( million). While the contract is still in force, however, the Berardo Collection Association may not sell cultural goods. The agreement was renewed in 2017 giving the Portuguese government the option to purchase works from the collection until the agreements ends in late 2022.

Since its opening, the collection was located at the Exhibition Center of the Centro Cultural de Belém, with over 1,000 works of art on permanent display and temporary exhibitions. From its opening until April 2011, the museum's art director was Jean-François Chougnet, who was then replaced by Pedro Lapa.

Collection
The collection was arranged in strictly linear fashion, leading visitors though a line of line of rooms with austere white walls on which are displayed examples of notable works of modern art with explanatory text offering a textbook-like survey of modern Western art from surrealism to pop art, hyper-realism, minimalist art to conceptual art in chronological order.

The museum had an extensive permanent collection and also hosts temporary exhibitions that change on a regular basis.  The permanent collection is valued by the auction house Christie's at €316 million.

List of important movements and artists

Abstract Expressionism
 Philip Guston, Untitled, 1957
 Joan Mitchell, Lucky Seven, 1962
 Lee Krasner, Visitation, 1973
 Sam Francis, Untitled, 1979
 Willem de Kooning, Untitled, c. 1976
Lee Krasner, Visitation, 1957

Abstraction-Création
 Georges Vantongerloo, SXR/3, 1936

Action Painting
 Jackson Pollock, Head, 1941
 Franz Kline, Sabro, 1956

Body Art
 Cindy Sherman, Untitled (Film Still Nº37), 1979

Constructivism
 El Lissitzky, Kestnermappe Proun, Rob. Levnis and Chapman GmbH Hannover, 1923
 Aleksandr Rodtsjenko, Portrait V. Majakowski, 1924

Cubism
 Albert Gleizes, Woman and Child, 1927
 Pablo Picasso, Tête de Femme, c.1909

De Stijl
Piet Mondrian, Tableau (yellow, black, blue, red and grey), 1923

 Vilmos Huszár, Untitled, 1924
 Georges Vantongerloo, Studies I, 1918

Digital Art
 Robert Silvers, JFK, 5/6, 2002

Experimental Art
 Ana Hatherly, O Pavão Negro, 1999

Geometric Abstraction
 Nadir Afonso, Marcoule, 1962

Kinetic Art
 Pol Bury, Mélangeur, 1961
 Alexander Calder, Black Spray, 1956
 Jean Tinguely, Indian Chief, 1961

Minimal art
 Carl Andre, 144th Travertine Integer, 1985
 Richard Artschwager, Trunk, 1964
 Larry Bell, Vertical Gradient on the Long Length, 1995
 Anthony Caro, Fleet, 1971
 Dan Flavin, Untitled (Monument to Vladimir Tatlin), 1964
 Ellsworth Kelly, Yellow Relief with Blue, 1991
 Sol LeWitt, Eight Sided Pyramid, 1992
 Richard Serra, Point Load, 1988
 Frank Stella, Hagamatana II, 1967
Agnes Martin, Untitled #5, 1989

Neo-Expressionism
 Georg Baselitz, Blonde ohne Stahlhelm- Otto D. (Blonde Without Helmet - Otto D.), 1987
 Anselm Kiefer, Elisabeth von Österreich, 1991
Gerhard Ritchter, Abstraktes Bild, 1987

Neo-Plasticism
 Piet Mondrian, Composition of Yellow, Black, Bleu and Grey, 1923

Neo-Realism
 Mário Dionísio, O Músico, 1948

Op art
 Bridget Riley, Orient IV, 1970
 Victor Vasarely, Bellatrix II, 1957

Photography
 Pepe Diniz, various works
 Jemima Stehli, various works
 Manuel Casimiro, Cidade 1, 1972
 Victor Palla, various works

Photorealism
 Tom Blackwell, Gary's Hustler, 1972
 Robert Cottingham, Dr. Gibson, 1971
 Don Eddy, Toyota Showroom Window I, 1972

Pop art
 Clive Barker, Fridge, 1999
 Peter Blake, Captain Webb Matchbox, 1962
 Jim Dine, Black Child's Room, 1962
 Richard Hamilton, Epiphany, 1989
 David Hockney, Picture Emphasizing Stillness, 1962
 Edward Kienholz, Drawing for the Soup Course at The She She Cafe, 1982
 Phillip King, Through, 1965
 Roy Lichtenstein, Interior with Restful Paintings, 1991
Tom Wesselmann, Great American Nude #52, 1963
 Nicholas Monro, ???
 Claes Oldenburg, Soft Light Switches 'Ghost' Version, 1963
 Sigmar Polke, Bildnis Helmut Klinker, 1965
 Mel Ramos, Virnaburger, 1965
 James Rosenquist, F-111, 1974
 George Segal, Flesh Nude behind Brown Door, 1978
 Andy Warhol, Campbell's Soup en various other works, 1965
 Evelyne Axell, L'Oeil de la Tigresse, 1964
 Mark Lancaster, various works

Realism
 Philip Pearlstein, Two Figures, 1963

Suprematism
 Kasimir Malevich, Suprematism: 34 Drawings, 1920
 Ljoebov Popova, various compositions

Surrealism
 Eileen Agar, Snake Charmer, 1936
 Hans Bellmer, La Toupie, 1956
 Gerardo Chavez, Vogteren Fro Fortides Kaos, 1979
 Salvador Dalí, White Aphrodisiac Telephone, 1936
 Julio González, Femme au Miroir Rouge, Vert et Jaune, 1936
 André Masson, Eleusis, 1963
 Pablo Picasso, Femme dans un Fauteuil, 1929
 Man Ray, Café Man Ray, 1948
 Paule Vézelay, Les Ballons et les Vases, 1934
 Paul Delvaux, Le Bain des Dames chez George Grard (S. Idesbald), 1947
 Fernando Lemos, various works

Fees
Admission was €5, visits to some of the temporary exhibitions may have an additional charge.

Location, access and facilities
The museum was located in the Belém Cultural Center, being the center of the modern cultural life of Lisbon. Across the street, is the Mosteiro dos Jerónimos.

Sources 
 Museu Colecção Berardo, Portuguese Wikipedia.

References

External links 
 Museu Colecção Berardo website 
 The Berardo Collection website 
Virtual tour of the Berardo Collection Museum provided by Google Arts & Culture

Art museums and galleries in Portugal
Museums in Lisbon
Contemporary art galleries in Europe
Modern art museums
Belém (Lisbon)
Art museums established in 2007
2007 establishments in Portugal
2022 disestablishments in Portugal
Defunct museums in Portugal